Mesua manii is a species of flowering plant in the Calophyllaceae family. It is found only on South Andaman Island in India. It is threatened by habitat loss.

References

Flora of the Andaman Islands
Critically endangered plants
manii
Taxonomy articles created by Polbot